Jean-Michel is a French masculine given name. It may refer to :
 Jean-Michel Arnold, General Secretary of the Cinémathèque Française
 Jean-Michel Atlan (1913–1960), French artist
 Jean-Michel Aulas (born 1949), French businessman
 Jean-Michel Badiane (born 1983), French football defender of Senegalese descent
 Jean-Michel Basquiat (1960–1988), American artist
 Jean-Michel Bayle (born 1969), semi-retired French professional motorcycle racer
 Jean-Michel Baylet (born 1946), French politician, Senator, and leader of the Radical Party
 Jean-Michel Bazire (born 1971), French harness racing driver
 Jean-Michel Bellot (born 1953), retired French male pole vaulter
 Jean-Michel Berthelot (1945–2006), French sociologist, philosopher, epistemologist and social theorist
 Jean-Michel Bertrand (1943–2008)
 Jean-Michel Beysser (1753–1794), French general
 Jean-Michel Bismut (born 1948), French mathematician
 Jean-Michel Bokamba-Yangouma, Congolese politician
 Jean-Michel Bombardier (born 1970), Canadian figure skater
 Jean-Michel Boucheron (disambiguation), several people
 Jean-Michel Byron, South African-born lead vocalist for rock band Toto
 Jean-Michel Caradec'h (born 1950), French journalist and writer 
 Jean-Michel Carré, French director of television documentaries
 Jean-Michel Cavalli (born 1957), French and Corsican licensed professional football manager
 Jean-Michel Cazes (born 1935), French winemaker and insurance executive
 Jean-Michel Charlier (1924–1989), Belgian script writer
 Jean-Michel Chevotet (1698–1772), French architect
 Jean Michel Claude Richard (1787–1868), French botanist and plant collector
 Jean-Michel Clément (born 1954), member of the National Assembly of France
 Jean-Michel Coron (born 1956), French mathematician
 Jean-Michel Cousteau (born 1938), French explorer, environmentalist, educator and film producer
 Jean-Michel Couve (born 1940), member of the National Assembly of France
 Jean-Michel Damase (1928–2013), French pianist, conductor and composer of classical music
 Jean-Michel Damian (1947-2016), French radio journalist
 Jean-Michel Daoust (born 1983), Canadian ice hockey player
 Jean-Michel-d'Astorg Aubarède (1639-1692), canon regular and Vicar Capitular of the diocese of Pamiers
 Jean-Michel d'Avray (born 1962), former professional football player
 Jean-Michel Defaye (born 1932), French composer
 Jean-Michel de Lepinay, governor of the French colony of Louisiana from 1717-18 
 Jean-Michel Dubernard (1941–2021), medical doctor specializing in transplant surgery
 Jean-Michel Dubois (born 1943), French politician and a member of the far-right FN
 Jean-Michel Dupuis (born 1955), French theatre, TV and film actor
 Jean-Michel Ferrand (born 1942), member of the National Assembly of France 
 Jean-Michel Ferri (born 1969), retired French football midfielder
 Jean-Michel Ferrière (born 1959), former professional football player
 Jean-Michel Folon (1934–2005), Belgian artist, illustrator, painter and sculptor
 Jean-Michel Fourgous (born 1953), member of the National Assembly of France
 Jean-Michel Frank (1895–1941), French interior designer
 Jean-Michel Frodon (born 1953), journalist, critic and historian of cinema
 Jean-Michel Gaillard (1946–2005), high-ranking French official
 Jean-Michel Gatete
 Jean-Michel Gonzalez (born 1967), former French rugby union player
 Jean-Michel Goudard (born 1939), French advertising man
 Jean-Michel Guilcher (1914–2017), French ethnologist
 Jean-Michel Huon de Kermadec (1748–1792), 18th-century Breton navigator
 Jean-Michel Iribarren (born 1958), French author
 Jean Michel Jarre (born 1948), French composer, performer and music producer
 Jean-Michel Labadie, member of the band Gojira
 Jean-Michel Larqué (born 1947), former football player and now a journalist
 Jean-Michel Lesage (born 1977), French football player
 Jean-Michel Liade Gnonka (born 1980), Burkinabé football player
 Jean-Michel Macron (born 1950), French professor of neurology
 Jean-Michel Maulpoix (born 1952), French author
 Jean-Michel Ménard 
 Jean-Michel Mension (born 1934), French radical active in the Lettrist International
 Jean-Michel Moutier (born 1955), retired French football player 
 Jean-Michel Moreau (1741–1814), French draughtsman and illustrator
 Jean-Michel Othoniel (born 1964), contemporary artist
 Jean-Michel Pequery (born 1978), retired French professional tennis player
 Jean-Michel Pilc (born 1960), self-taught French-born jazz pianist
 Jean-Michel Reginer, French slalom canoer
 Jean-Michel Ribes (born 1946), French actor, playwright, screenwriter, theatre director and film maker
 Jean-Michel Rouzière (-1989), French comic actor and theatre head
 Jean-Michel Saive (born 1969), Belgian professional table tennis player
 Jean-Michel Savéant (born 1933), French chemist specialized in electrochemistry
 Jean-Michel Severino, managing director of France's international development agency
 Jean-Michel Sigere (born 1977), French football striker
 Jean-Michel Simonella (born 1962), former professional football player
 Jean-Michel Soupraya (born 1973), French music conductor, record producer, musical arranger and film composer 
 Jean-Michel Tchouga (born 1978), football player from Cameroon
 Jean-Michel Thierry, French doctor and art historian
 Jean-Michel Tobie, mayor of the city of Ancenis in Loire-Atlantique, France
 Jean-Michel Villaumé (born 1946), member of the National Assembly of France
 Jean-Michel Wilmotte (born 1948), French architect and designer

and also :
 Jean-Michel and his team, controversial Evangelical-oriented new religious movement founded in 1975
 Jean Michel (poet) (died 1501), 15th-century French dramatic poet
 Jean Michel (politician) (born 1949), French politician
 Jean-Michel Irankunda(born 2005), Rwandan mechanical, electronic engineering enthusiast and innovator and a Computer Generated Imagery(CGI) artist. 

Compound given names
French masculine given names